Khrennikov is a surname which may refer to:

 Tikhon Khrennikov (19132007), Russian composer and pianist
 Aleksandr Khrennikov (18961984), Russian-Canadian engineer
  (18761935), Ukrainian estate owner known the Khrennikov House.